Group G of the 2006 FIFA World Cup began on 13 June and completed on 23 June 2006. Switzerland won the group and advanced to the second round, along with France, who went on to reach the final. South Korea and Togo failed to advance. Switzerland were the only team not to concede a goal during the group stage of the tournament and would become the first team to be knocked out of a World Cup without conceding, losing on penalties after a 0–0 draw with Ukraine in the round of 16.

Standings

Switzerland advanced to play Ukraine (runners-up of Group H) in the round of 16.
France advanced to play Spain (winners of Group H) in the round of 16.

Matches
All times local (CEST/UTC+2)

South Korea vs Togo

France vs Switzerland
After a streak of 22 matches without one, Switzerland achieved their first clean sheet in a World Cup match. They went on to become the first team in history to be eliminated from a FIFA World Cup without conceding a goal.

France vs South Korea

Togo vs Switzerland

Togo vs France

Switzerland vs South Korea

References

G group
Switzerland at the 2006 FIFA World Cup
Group
South Korea at the 2006 FIFA World Cup
Group